Mera Khuda Janay is a Pakistani drama serial that premiered on Geo Tv on 2 May 2018. It is written by Samina Ejaz, produced by Asad Qureshi and Abdullah Kadwani and directed by Zeeshan Ahmed. It stars Ali Abbas, Hira Mani and Anum Fayyaz.

Mera Khuda Janay revolves around Roohi (Hira Mani) who is married to Waleed (Ali Abbas); but, due to being childless in the six years of marriage, her mother in law arranges for Waleed to marry another girl, Iqra (Anum Fayyaz).

Cast

Main Cast
Ali Abbas as Waleed
Hira Mani as Roohi
Anum Fayyaz as Iqra
Aly Khan as Shafiq

Supporting Characters
Nida Mumtaz as Kulsoom
Rabia Noreen as Razia
Alizey Rasool as Shahana
Fouzia Mushtaq as Bushra
Injeel as Takbeer

Production
The drama is produced by the duo of Asad Qureshi and Abdullah Kadwani under the banner of 7th Sky Entertainment who produced serials such as Meri Zaat Zara-e-Benishan, Mohabbat Tumse Nafrat Hai, Tum Kon Piya, Khaali Haath and later Khaani and Ghar Titli Ka Par. It is the first collaboration of Yaar-E-Bewafa director Zeeshan Ahmed with 7th Sky Entertainment.

Release
The drama was first aired on 2 May 2018 on Wednesday at 8:00pm on Geo TV.

References

2018 Pakistani television series debuts
Pakistani television series
7th Sky Entertainment